Estadio Chevron (formerly known as Estadio Nacional de Tijuana, Estadio de Beisbol Calimax, and Estadio Gasmart) is a baseball stadium located in Tijuana, Baja California, in Mexico with a capacity of 17,000, all seated. It was built in 1976 with a capacity of 14,000 and named Cerro Colorado Stadium, after a supermarket chain based in Baja California. It was expanded in 2006 to its current capacity of 17,000.

The stadium was inaugurated on October 12, 1977 with a game between the Potros de Tijuana and the Águilas de Mexicali of the Mexican Pacific League. In 2004, professional baseball returned, now with a Mexican Baseball League franchise under the name "Toros de Tijuana". The following year would change its name to "Potros de Tijuana", as they were known in their previous iterations and would be from 2005 to 2008. It played host to the Tijuana Cimarrones of the Golden Baseball League for one season in 2010. Most recently, it has been hosting the second iteration of the Toros de Tijuana, members of the Liga Norte de México (League of Northern Mexico). This iteration of the Toros de Tijuana would join the Mexican Baseball Leagues in 2014.

Estadio Chevron has also been the site of several México Segunda División (second division) and 
México Tercera División football clubs in the Mexican League System, such as Inter de Tijuana, Chivas Tijuana, and Nacional Tijuana.

References

Estadio Chevron
Sports venues in Tijuana
Mexican League ballparks
Sports venues completed in 1976